Gulf Coast State College is a public college in Panama City, Florida. It is part of the Florida College System and offers the Associate of Arts degree, Associate of Science degree, certificates, and as of 2011, bachelor's degrees.

History 
The institution was founded in 1957 by the Florida Legislature. On January 13, 2011, the college was renamed Gulf Coast State College. The school had previously been named Gulf Coast Community College as well as Gulf Coast Junior College.

In 1966, Rosenwald Junior College was merged with Gulf Coast Junior College.

Campus 
The main college campus is in Panama City, Florida, with other campuses in Southport, Port St. Joe, and at Tyndall Air Force Base.

Organization and administration 
The college is a member institution of the Florida College System. Its president is John Holdnak, Ed.D. President Holdnak is its sixth, having assumed that position in June, 2014.  A District Board of Trustees oversees the administration of the college.

Academics 
Gulf Coast State College offers associate and bachelor's degrees.

Student life

Athletics 
Gulf Coast State College Athletic teams are nicknamed the Commodores and participate in men's basketball, men's baseball, women's basketball, women's softball, and women's volleyball. The school's athletic teams compete in the Panhandle Conference of the Florida State College Activities Association, a body of the National Junior College Athletic Association Region 8.

Notable people 

Daniel Davidson - Former Major League Baseball pitcher
Tony Dawson - Former NBA player
Vontrell Jamison - Former NFL player
Smoke Laval - College baseball coach of Louisiana–Monroe, LSU, and North Florida
Frank Menechino - Former Major League Baseball infielder for the Oakland Athletics and the Toronto Blue Jays
Michael Papajohn - American actor, stuntman, and college baseball player
Jimmy Patronis - Chief Financial Officer of Florida, State Fire Marshal, and member of the Florida Cabinet.
Don Sutton - Former Major League Baseball player and television sportscaster.  Holds the Los Angeles Dodgers all time wins record (233), and held the Dodgers strikeout record (2696) for 42 years.
Terrance Gore - MLB player who won three World Series rings: the 2015 World Series with the Kansas City Royals, the 2020 World Series with the Los Angeles Dodgers, and the 2021 World Series with the Atlanta Braves.
Matt Foster - Current MLB player for the Chicago White Sox

References

External links 
 

 
Education in Bay County, Florida
Educational institutions established in 1957
Florida College System
Universities and colleges accredited by the Southern Association of Colleges and Schools
1957 establishments in Florida
Buildings and structures in Panama City, Florida